Roger Howard Cilley (May 22, 1918 – September 26, 1986) was a suffragan bishop of the Episcopal Diocese of Texas.

Early life and education
Cilley was born in Corning, New York on May 22, 1918. He studied at New York University from where he graduated with a Bachelor of Arts in 1947 and a Master of Arts in 1949. Between 1951 and 1953, Cilley was an Assistant Professor of Drama at the University of Texas, after which he decided to enroll at the Seminary of the Southwest where he trained for the priesthood and earned his Master of Divinity in 1956. He was also awarded a Doctor of Divinity by the seminary and the University of the South.

Ordained Ministry
Cilley was ordained deacon in July 1956 and priest in June 1957 by Bishop John E. Hines of Texas. He initially served as assistant and later as rector of St Thomas' Church in College Station, Texas between 1956 and 1958, and episcopal chaplain at the 	Agricultural and Mechanical College of Texas. In 1958, he was appointed rector of Holy Comforter in Angleton, Texas where he remained until his transfer to Trinity Church in Galveston, Texas in 1962. While at Trinity, he also undertook several posts within the diocese and served as a deputy to six General Conventions. Cilley was also involved as a consultant to the Prayer Book Revision Committee between 1967 and 1973.

Episcopacy
In 1975, Cilley was elected Suffragan Bishop of Texas and was consecrated on March 20, 1976 by Presiding Bishop John Allin. He remained in office until his retirement in 1985. Cilley died a year later in San Antonio on September 26 when attending the interim House of Bishops meeting.

References

1918 births
1986 deaths
20th-century American Episcopalians
Episcopal bishops of Texas
20th-century American clergy
Seminary of the Southwest alumni